The 1994 Algarve Cup was the inaugural edition of the Algarve Cup, an invitational women's association football tournament. It took place between 16  and 20 March 1994 in Portugal with Norway winning the event, defeating the USA, 1-0 in the final game. Sweden ended up third defeating Denmark, 1-0, in the game for third prize.

Format
The inaugural competition was contested between the hosts Portugal, four Scandinavian teams (Denmark, Finland, Norway and Sweden) and the USA. Only two confederations were thus represented, CONCACAF and UEFA.

The six invited teams were split into two groups that played a round-robin tournament. On completion of this, the third placed teams in each group would play each other to decide fifth and sixth place, the second placed teams in each group would play to determine third and fourth place and the winners of each group would compete for first and second place overall.

Points awarded in the group stage followed the standard formula of three points for a win, one point for a draw and zero points for a loss.

All times WET (UTC±00:00).

Group A

1991 FIFA Women's World Cup winners; the United States, finished in the top position of Group A with maximum points after winning both of their games including defeating the hosts Portugal 5–0.

Group B

Norway, 1991 World Cup runner's up, defeated their neighbours Denmark and Finland by scoring six goals in each match.

Fifth Place

Third Place

Final

In a replay of the 1991 FIFA Women's World Cup Final, Norway once again faced the USA but won on this occasion.

Awards

Goalscorers
5 goals
 Ann Kristin Aarønes
2 goals

 Birthe Hegstad
 Carin Gabarra

1 goal

 Christina Hansen
 Janne Rasmussen
 Agnete Carlsen
 Elin Krokan
 Linda Medalen
 Hege Riise
 Kristin Sandberg
 Carla Couto
 Patrícia Sequeira
 Annika Nessvold
 Helen Nilsson
 Lena Videkull
 Julie Foudy
 Mia Hamm
 Kristine Lilly
 Tiffeny Milbrett

Own goal

 ? (against Norway)
 Anabela Cazuza (against Sweden)

References

External links
1994 Algarve Cup on RSSSF

1994
1994 in women's association football
1993–94 in Portuguese football
1994 in Norwegian women's football
1994 in American women's soccer
1994 in Swedish women's football
1993–94 in Danish football
1994 in Finnish football
March 1994 sports events in Europe
1994 in Portuguese women's sport